Colombine is a 1920 German silent film directed by Martin Hartwig and starring Emil Jannings, Margarete Lanner and Alex Otto.

Cast
 Emil Jannings as Carlo 
 Margarete Lanner
 Alex Otto
 Gustav Adolf Semler
 Erich Ziegel

References

Bibliography
 Monaco, James. The Encyclopedia of Film. Perigee Books, 1991.

External links

1920 films
Films of the Weimar Republic
Films directed by Martin Hartwig
German silent feature films
German black-and-white films